Exposure is the sixth studio album by bassist and singer Esperanza Spalding. It was released on December 16, 2017, by Concord Records. It is a limited edition album, with only 7,777 copies being available.

Background

With an aim to finish ten songs for this project, Spalding started broadcasting the writing, arranging, and recording of Exposure at 9am PST on September 12, 2017 via Facebook Live for 77 hours straight. The live stream took place at NRG Recording Studios and included breaks for sleep and sustenance, adding a layer of reality-TV voyeurism to the experiment. Spalding chose to do the experiment in 77 hours because she was once told by a reverend that "seven is a divine number. It’s the number of completion. It represents the earthly culmination of a divine thought", and she enjoyed that sentiment. She has stated that the premise of Exposure is that all the facets of creators only need the right environment to coalesce into completeness.

Exposure exists as a limited edition of 7,777 physical copies, all individually signed and numbered, as well as an original piece of notepaper Esperanza will have used to write the lyrics and music, allowing those who witnessed the process to own a piece of the creation itself, directly from the source. A second disc, labeled as "Undeveloped", was included with the album and consists of ten additional, bonus tracks of works made prior to the development of the Exposure.

All 7,777 physical albums were announced and available for pre-order on July 26, 2017, and were completely sold out on the final day of Spalding's live stream on September 15, 2017.

Critical reception

In his review for Pitchfork, Seth Colter Walls commented, "As tempting as it may be to think that disciplined artists like Spalding can just turn on a genius tap and let the product flow, Exposure reveals some measure of what is required when an established artist hopes to improve and innovate."  Kevin Le Gendre of Jazzwise noted, "Written, performed, recorded and mixed in 77 hours while live streamed on Facebook, the music stands up as a coherent piece of work, in which Spalding's melodic strength is consistent and the no-frills production actually a far cry from the somewhat overly dense predecessor Emily's D + Evolution. Put simply, Spalding has pulled out the stops with regard to her composing, straddling the line between jazz, soul and pop, while keeping the group identity strong. It is on the downtempo material that the assembled players gel most convincingly..."

Track listing

Personnel
Credits adapted from the liner notes of Exposure.

Main personnel
 Esperanza Spalding – vocals, acoustic bass, electric bass, kalimba
 Ray Angry – keyboards (not on Undeveloped tracks)
 Matthew Stevens – guitar
 Justin Tyson – drums
 Robert Glasper – piano (track 3)
 Lalah Hathaway – vocals (track 5)
 Andrew Bird – vocals, violin (track 8)
 Rob Schwimmer – continuum (Undeveloped tracks)
 Tivona Miller – backing vocals (Undeveloped tracks)
 Starr Busby – backing vocals (Undeveloped tracks)

Additional personnel
 Fernando Lodeiro – recording (tracks 1–11, 14–20), mixing
 Zach Brown (at Sullivan Street Studio) – recording (tracks 12 and 13)
 Rich Costey – mixing
 Paul Blakemore (at CMG Mastering, Cleveland, OH) – mastering

References

External links

2017 albums
Esperanza Spalding albums